Trevico is a town and comune in the province of Avellino, Campania, southern Italy.

Located in the Apennines upon a steep hill at 3,576 feet (1,090 m) altitude, Trevico is the highest inhabited place in Campania. Its main produce are hams, chestnuts and potatoes, each of them is awarded PAT quality mark.

The town is part of the Roman Catholic Diocese of Ariano Irpino-Lacedonia and its territory borders with the municipalities of Carife, Castel Baronia, San Nicola Baronia, San Sossio Baronia, Scampitella, Vallata, and Vallesaccarda.

People 

 Rosa Giannetta, journalist and a professor of sociology
 Vincent DeMarco, President of the Maryland Citizens' Health Initiative

See also 
 Trivicum

References

External links 
 

Cities and towns in Campania
Hilltowns in Campania